The 2024 European Women's Handball Championship will be held in Austria, Hungary and Switzerland from 28 November to 15 December 2024. This will be the first tournament to feature 24 teams.

Bidding process
The vote took place on 25 January 2020 at the EHF Extraordinary Congress in Stockholm. The solo bid of Russia was eliminated in the first round, leaving the joint bids of Austria/Hungary/Switzerland and Czech Republic/Poland/Slovakia. The final round Austria/Hungary/Switzerland was awarded the event over Czech Republic/Poland/Slovakia by 7 votes with 28–21.

Venues 

The final weekend was scheduled to be held at the MVM Dome in Budapest, Hungary, but later it was replaced with the Wiener Stadthalle in Vienna, Austria.

Qualification

Qualified teams 

1 Bold indicates champion for that year

Marketing
The official logo was unveiled on 19 November 2022 at the closing press conference of the 2022 edition in Ljubljana, Slovenia.

References

Weblinks 

website
bid website

2024
European Championship, Women
European Championship, Women, 2024
European Championship, Women, 2024
European Championship, Women, 2024
2024
2024
2024
2024
November 2024 sports events in Europe
December 2024 sports events in Europe
European Women's